Truce/Treaty of Vilna or Truce/Treaty of Niemieża was a treaty signed at Niemieża (modern Nemėžis) near Vilnius (also known as Vilna)  on 3 November 1656 between Tsardom of Russia and Polish–Lithuanian Commonwealth, introducing a truce during the Russo-Polish War (1654–67) and an anti-Swedish alliance in the contemporaneous Second Northern War. In return for ceasing hostilities and fighting Sweden alongside Poland–Lithuania, the treaty promised Alexis of Russia succession in Poland after John II Casimir Vasa's death. The Cossacks under Bohdan Khmelnytsky were excluded from the negotiations, and subsequently supported the Transylvanian invasion on the Swedish side.

Developments
After a series of successes for the Russian forces, with an even more successful Swedish invasion of Polish–Lithuanian Commonwealth, the Russian tsar decided that total defeat of the Commonwealth and Swedish victory leading to major strengthening of Sweden (a threat to Russia) would not be in the best interests of Russia.

The negotiations began in Autumn of 1655, between Field Hetman of Lithuania Wincenty Korwin Gosiewski and Russian commander Afanasy Ordin-Nashchokin, and led to a quick ceasefire along the Polish-Russian front, allowing the Commonwealth to concentrate on the Swedish incursion. In the light of its successes, the Commonwealth's stance in the negotiations intensified, and it has rejected Russian territorial demands; however both Poland and Russia agreed to continue engaging Sweden. There were also negotiations about the Russian tsar or his descendant ascending to the Commonwealth's throne (see Polish–Lithuanian–Muscovite Commonwealth). Russian forces marched on Swedish Livonia and besieged Riga in the Russo-Swedish War (1656–58). The Russian ally, Zaporozhian Cossack hetman Bohdan Khmelnytsky was informed about the Russian plans; he was not against a temporary armistice with Poland as such; but he was afraid of an alliance between Russia and Poland aimed at crushing Cossack rebellion as a possible consequence of the treaty.

In 1658 the Russo-Polish war would resume, with another Russian invasion of the Commonwealth territories.

References

Vilna
Swedish Livonia
Vilna
Poland–Russia relations
Vilna
Vilna
Vilna
1656 in Europe
1656 in the Polish–Lithuanian Commonwealth
1656 in Russia
1656 in Sweden
Bilateral treaties of Russia